Paul Munster (born 9 February 1982) is a Northern Irish former professional footballer who played as a striker. He is currently the technical director of the Brunei national football team.

Playing career 
Munster began his career at the youth level with Cliftonville in 2001. He traveled to Kitchener, Ontario in order to conduct a six-week sport and school exchange to coach. While conducting lessons he severely torn his knee ligament. As a result, his club released him from his contract effectively sidelining his career. He returned to Canada in 2004 in order to assist Eddie Edgar with his coaching academy. Edgar secured him a trial with London City of the Canadian Professional Soccer League. After a successful trial he played with club's reserve squad, where he scored 12 goals in 3 matches to promote him to the first team.

He made his debut on 18 June 2004 against Metro Lions, where he scored in his debut in a 2–1 defeat. What followed was a stellar season where he became an instant success by finishing as the league's top goalscorer with 25 goals in 19 appearances. The league recognized his contributions with the CPSL Rookie of the Year award. After an impressive debut season in the CPSL he was signed by Slavia Prague of the Czech First League. He became the first Irishman to play in the league when he made his debut on 21 November 2004 against FK Chmel Blšany.

After one season with Slavia Prague where he appeared in 3 league matches and voted fans player of the month. In 2006, he went to Scandinavia to sign with Örebro SK of the Superettan. Midway through the season he was transferred to Bunkeflo IF in the Division 1, where he assisted in promoting the club to the Superettan.

He returned to the Czech Republic to play with SK Hradec Kralove in the Czech National Football League. He finished as the club's top goalscorer with 10 goals. In 2008, he returned home to sign with Linfield in the NIFL Premiership. In his first season with Linfield the lethal striker scored an impressive 17 goals in 20 starts. Throughout his tenure with Linfield he won the league title and Irish Cup in 2009/10 and 2010/11, and was the club's top goalscorer in the 2009/2010 season.

In January 2011 Linfield rejected an offer from Hellas Verona of the Lega Pro. The offer was turned down by the Belfast club, even though Munster was leaving in the summer as a free agent. After his contract expired he signed with FC Anker Wismar in the NOFV-Oberliga Nord.

Coaching career
In 2012, Munster retired from competitive football in order to manage Assyriska BK in the Swedish Football Division 2. The following season he was appointed manager of Örebro Syrianska IF in the Division 1. In 2014, he was given managerial responsibilities at BK Forward, and was appointed head coach of the Örebro SK under-19 team. On 24 February 2019, Munster was named the head coach for the Vanuatu national football team. Eight months later, he was offered a contract to manage Bhayangkara F.C. in the Indonesian Liga 1. Munster left Bhayangkara on 31 March 2022, after his contract wasn't renewed.

Minerva Punjab 
On 8 August 2018, Munster was appointed Technical Director and Head Coach for Indian I-League club Minerva Punjab. On 8 February 2019, he announced his resignation, citing personal reasons.

Bhayangkara FC
On 1 September 2019, Munster was appointed as the new Head Coach for Indonesian club Bhayangkara F.C.
Arriving half way through the season with the club in 13th place, Munster managed to finish the season in 4th place and as Siem Reap Super Asia Cup Champions, beating Malaysian club Petaling Jaya City 2—1 in the final in Cambodia.

The 2021 Season was Munster's final season with the club, finishing in 3rd place, qualifying for the AFC Cup.

Brunei
On 17 August 2022, Munster was unveiled as the new technical director of the Brunei national football team. Under his watch, Brunei managed to qualify for the 2022 AFF Championship for the first time in 26 years.

Statistics

Honours 
As player

Linfield
Irish League Championship: 3 
2007–08, 2009–10, 2010–11
Irish Cup: 2
2009–10, 2010–11

Individual

 Linfield Player of the Year: 2008–09

As coach

 Siem Reap Super Asia Cup 2020
 Tri Nations League 2019
 Punjab Super League 2018
 J&K Invitational Cup 2018
 Swedish Cup U-19 called " Svenska Cupen" in 2017 with Örebro Sportklubb U-19
 Best Irish Coach of abroad 2016-2017

Managerial statistics

References 

1982 births
Living people
Association footballers from Belfast
Association footballers from Northern Ireland
Association football forwards
Cliftonville F.C. players
Czech First League players
SK Slavia Prague players
Örebro SK players
IF Limhamn Bunkeflo (men) players
FC Hradec Králové players
Linfield F.C. players
Canadian Soccer League (1998–present) players
NIFL Premiership players
Expatriate association footballers from Northern Ireland
Expatriate footballers in the Czech Republic
Expatriate sportspeople from Northern Ireland in the Czech Republic
Expatriate footballers in Sweden
Expatriate sportspeople from Northern Ireland in Sweden
Expatriate soccer players in Canada
Expatriate sportspeople from Northern Ireland in Canada
FC Anker Wismar players
London City players
Expatriate sportspeople from Northern Ireland in India
Expatriate sportspeople from Northern Ireland in Germany
Vanuatu national football team managers
Football managers from Northern Ireland
RoundGlass Punjab FC managers
Expatriate sportspeople from Northern Ireland in Vanuatu
Expatriate football managers in Vanuatu
Expatriate football managers in Brunei